Rice is a cereal grain.

Rice, Rice's or Rices may also refer to:

People
 Rice (surname), including a list of people with the surname
 Rice (given name), a list of people

Geography
 Rice, California, a vacant town site
 Rice, Kansas, an unincorporated community
 Rice, Minnesota, a city
 Rice, Ohio, an unincorporated community
 Rice, Oregon, an unincorporated community
 Rice, Texas, a city
 Rice, Virginia, an unincorporated community
 Rice, Washington, an unincorporated community
 Rice County (disambiguation)
 Rice Township (disambiguation)
 Rice Lake (disambiguation)
 Rice Fork, a tributary of the Eel River, California
 Rice Creek (disambiguation)
 Fort Rice, a 19th-century frontier military fort in what is now North Dakota
 Rice Strait, Canada
 Rice Bastion, a mountain mass in Antarctica
 Rice Ridge, Antarctica
 Rices Spring, a spring in Georgia
 Rice Valley, California

Schools
 Rice University, Houston, Texas
 Rice Owls, the athletic program of Rice University
 The Rice School, a public combined elementary and secondary school associated with Rice University
 Rice High School (disambiguation) 
 Rice Middle School, Plano, Texas
 Rice College, a secondary school in Ireland

Music
 Rice (band), a Japanese duo
 Rice Music, a Japanese record label

Buildings
 The Rice (Houston), formerly Rice Hotel, a historic building in Houston, Texas
 Rice Apartments, Eugene Oregon, on the National Register of Historic Places (NRHP)
 Rice Covered Bridge, Pennsylvania, on the NRHP
 Rice House (disambiguation), various buildings on the NRHP
 Rice Stadium (disambiguation)

Other uses
 Rice (cooking), a food–processing technique
 RICE (medicine), a mnemonic acronym relating to treatment for soft-tissue injuries
 RICE (chemotherapy), a chemotherapy regimen containing Rituximab, Ifosfamide, Carboplatin and Etoposide
 Rice (novel), a Chinese novel by Su Tong
 Rice (film), a 1963 South Korean film
 Radio Ice Cerenkov Experiment, a Cherenkov emission detection project
 Rice Army Airfield, near Rice, California
 RICE chart, a table for tracking chemical reactions
 Rice (journal), published by Springer Publishing

See also
 Rise (disambiguation)
 Rice Epicurean Markets, an American specialty grocery chain